Acaulospora alpina is a species of fungus in the family Acaulosporaceae. It forms arbuscular mycorrhiza and vesicles in roots.

References

Diversisporales
Fungi described in 2006
Fungi of Europe